The 8th Parliament of Queen Elizabeth I was summoned by Queen Elizabeth I of England on 4 January 1593 and assembled on 19 February following. At the state opening of Parliament the Lord Keeper Sir John Puckering informed the house that the reasons for summoning the Parliament were the threat of Spanish invasion and the Queen's "extraordinarye and most excessive expenses". Edward Coke, the Solicitor-general and Member of Parliament (MP) for Norfolk, was appointed speaker of the commons.

On 24 January Peter Wentworth, the MP  for Northampton, sought leave to present a bill for "intayling (restricting) the (royal) succession", for which he was sent to the Tower of London and four other colluding MPs locked in the Fleet Prison for the duration of the session.

James Morice, the MP for Colchester, wanted to introduce two bills to restrict the jurisdiction of the bishops, but the Queen was highly offended and ordered Parliament not to get involved in ecclesiastical affairs. Morice was put under house arrest for the duration of the Parliament.

After a great deal of debate on the issue of raising money to deal with the threat of invasion a compromise was eventually reached on a subsidy. Two other bills were passed restricting the rights and freedoms of Catholics. In total 14 public and 13 private statutes received the royal assent.

The Parliament was dissolved on 10 April 1593.

Notable Acts of the Parliament
 Religion Act 1592 
 Popish Recusants Act 1592

See also
 Acts of the 8th Parliament of Elizabeth I
 List of MPs elected to the English parliament in 1593
 List of parliaments of England

References

 
 Keeper, Lord, and J. E. Neale. "The Lord Keeper's Speech to the Parliament of 1592/3." The English Historical Review 31, no. 121 (1916): 128–37. http://www.jstor.org/stable/550707.

1593 establishments in England
1593 in politics